App Installer is a software component of Windows 10, introduced in the 2016 Anniversary Update, used for the installation and maintenance of applications packaged in .appx or .appxbundle installation packages; they are loosely relational databases with an XML app manifest. The .appx and .appxbundle files contain either a Win32  or a Universal Windows Platform app, icons for the Start menu and taskbar, a virtualized version of any Windows Registry keys needed, and any other assets needed for the installed app to function.

The only other Windows components capable of installing APPX packages are Windows Store and Windows PowerShell. However, the latter requires Developer Mode to be turned on. App Installer provides a more user-friendly interface that is opened by clicking on the installation package.

The design for App Installer is similar to the one for the classic Windows Installer, which installs stand-alone MSI files. It shows the app name, the developer, the app's Start menu tile, and a set of capabilities enabled by the app manifest. If the user clicks the Install button at the bottom right corner, the App Installer checks the app's digital certificate. Unlike a standalone installer, App Installer refuses to install an app without a valid digital certificate. If the certificate is valid, the app displays a blue installation progress bar and shows the user a button to launch the app once it is fully installed.

App Installer is physically more flexible than Windows Installer. It can be resized and viewed in full-screen mode and the background changes based on the system-wide light or dark mode. Apps installed with App Installer can be updated through the Windows Store. It is also possible to update an app with App Installer by opening package with a higher version number than the one installed. Since APPX installations are sandboxed, unlike traditional software, it is possible to run multiple installations at once.

References 

Installation software
Windows components
Windows administration